The Voice India Kids is an Indian singing reality competition television series that airs on &TV or StarPlus. The series is produced by Endemol India. Kumar Priyadarshi is one of the editors of The Voice India Kids.

Format
This show based on The Voice India. The show will allow young singers between the age group of 6–14 years to showcase their talent in front of a national audience. The show is part of The Voice franchise and is structured in three phases: Blind auditions, Battle rounds, and Live performance shows.

Blind auditions
The first stage is the blind auditions, where artists sing in front of the judges/coaches. In this round, each coach selects 15 singers for their team. Four coaches, all noteworthy recording artists, choose teams of contestants through a blind audition process. Each coach has the length of the auditioner's performance (about 90 seconds) to decide if they want the singer on their team. If one of the coaches is satisfied with the voice of an artist, and wants to mentor them for the next stage, they press the "I WANT YOU" button by their chair. This turns the chair around to face the stage, and allows the coach to see the artist for the first time after they have sung. This avoids any bias on the part of the judge/coach because of an artist's characteristics or personality. If two or more coaches want the same singer, the singer chooses their coach. The artist's journey on the show comes to an end if no coach selects them.

Battle rounds
Each team of singers is then mentored and developed by their coach in the second stage, called the Battle Round. The team coaches help to develop their artists by giving them advice, and sharing the secrets of their success in the music industry. The coaches have two of their own team members battle each other by singing the same song. The coach chooses which team member will advance to the next stage. The judges then have to choose from the individual "battles" which artists to take to the Live Round.[3]

Live shows
The third stage, Live Shows, is where the remaining seven members of each team perform solo and try to entertain the audience and to impress the judges. After Round 1, each of the coaches can save three contestants to progress. After Rounds 2 and 3, each coach can save two contestants to progress. After Round 4, each coach can save one contestant to progress to the semi-final round. The remaining contestants progress, or not, based on a public vote conducted after each round.

In the semi-finals, the final two contestants from each team face off against each other. The judges then split 100 points between the two performers of their team. The winner is decided by the combination of public votes received and points given by their respective judges.

In the finals, the winner is chosen from the final four contestants, one from each team, based on the results of the live public voting.

Coaches
 Neeti Mohan (Season 1)
 Shaan (Season 1-2)
 Shekhar Ravjiani (Season 1)
 Palak Muchhal (Season 2)
 Papon (Season 2)
 Himesh Reshammiya (Season 2)

Season summary
Colour key

 Team Shaan
 Team Neeti
 Team Shekhar

Season 1 (2016)
Nishtha Sharma of Uttar Pradesh won the first edition of The Voice India Kids. She was the contestant from Team Neeti Mohan. She received a cheque of Rs 25,00,000, along with a recording contract from Universal Music. Nishtha belongs to a musically inclined family of Sultanpur.Kavya Limaye (Team Neeti)   was the 1st runner up and Pooja Insa (Team Shaan) was the 2nd runner up of the season.

Season 2 (2017-18)
Manashi Sahariah of Udmari, Assam won the second edition of The Voice India Kids. She was the contestant from Team Palak . She received a cheque of Rs. 25,00,000, along with a recording contract from Universal Music. The 1st runner up was Neelanjana Ray (Team Shaan) followed by Shruti Goswami (Team Papon). Both got a prize amount of Rs. 10,00,000 each.

Battles (Season 2) 

The battles are the 2nd round of the show , where 3 singers from the same team sing the same song. Then the coach decides the winner, taking the singer to the 3rd round.

Top 20 (Season 2)

Top 12 (Season 2)

Top 6 (Season 2)

References

External links
Official website

Hindi-language television shows
Singing talent shows
Television shows set in Mumbai
The Voice (Indian TV series)
Reality television spin-offs
Indian television spin-offs
2016 Indian television series debuts
&TV original programming
Television series about children
Television series about teenagers